Computational magnetohydrodynamics (CMHD) is a rapidly developing branch of magnetohydrodynamics that uses numerical methods and algorithms to solve and analyze problems that involve electrically conducting fluids. Most of the methods used in CMHD are borrowed from the well established techniques employed in Computational fluid dynamics. The complexity mainly arises due to the presence of a magnetic field and its coupling with the fluid.

Open-source MHD software
Pencil CodeCompressible resistive MHD, intrinsically divergence free, embedded particles module, finite-difference explicit scheme, high-order derivatives, Fortran95 and C, parallelized up to hundreds of thousands cores. Source code is available.
RAMSES RAMSES is an open source program to model astrophysical systems, featuring self-gravitating, magnetised, compressible, radiative fluid flows. It is based on the Adaptive Mesh Refinement (AMR) technique on a fully threaded graded octree. RAMSES is written in Fortran 90 and is making intensive use of the Message Passing Interface (MPI) library. Source code is available.
RamsesGPU RamsesGPU is an MHD program written in C++, based on the original RAMSES but only for regular grid (no AMR). The code has been designed to run on large clusters of GPU (NVIDIA graphics processors), so parallelization relies on MPI for distributed memory processing, as well as the programing language CUDA for efficient usage of GPU resources. Static Gravity Fields are supported. Different finite volume methods are implemented. Source code is available.
AthenaAthena is a grid-based program for astrophysical magnetohydrodynamics (MHD). It was developed primarily for studies of the interstellar medium, star formation, and accretion flows. Source code is available.
EOF-Library EOF-Library is a software that couples Elmer FEM and OpenFOAM simulation packages. It enables efficient internal field interpolation and communication between the finite element and the finite volume frameworks. Potential applications are MHD, convective cooling of electrical devices, industrial plasma physics and microwave heating of liquids.

Closed-source MHD software
USim
MACH2
STAR-CCM+

See also
 Magnetohydrodynamic turbulence
 Magnetic flow meter
 Plasma modeling

References

 Brio, M., Wu, C. C.(1988), "An upwind differencing scheme for the equations of ideal magnetohydrodynamics", Journal of Computational Physics, 75, 400–422.
 Henri-Marie Damevin and Klaus A. Hoffmann(2002), "Development of a Runge-Kutta Scheme with TVD for Magnetogasdynamics", Journal of Spacecraft and Rockets, 34,No.4, 624–632.
 Robert W. MacCormack(1999), "An upwind conservation form method for ideal magnetohydrodynamics equations", AIAA-99-3609.
 Robert W. MacCormack(2001), "A conservation form method for magneto-fluid dynamics", AIAA-2001-0195.

Further reading
 Toro, E. F. (1999), Riemann Solvers and Numerical Methods for Fluid Dynamics, Springer-Verlag.

External links
 NCBI

Magnetohydrodynamics, Computational
Magnetohydrodynamics, Computational
Computational fields of study